William John Briggs (born December 25, 1943) is a former American football defensive end who played professionally in the National Football League (NFL) for the Washington Redskins.  He played college football at the University of Iowa and was drafted in the fifth round of the 1966 NFL Draft.

References

1943 births
Living people
American football defensive ends
Iowa Hawkeyes football players
Washington Redskins players
People from Sanford, North Carolina